Johnny W. Cox (born November 1, 1936) is a retired American basketball player.

A 6'4" guard from Hazard High School in Kentucky,won a state championship in 1955 at Hazard .Cox starred at the University of Kentucky from 1956 to 1959. He scored 1,461 points in 84 career games and won an NCAA championship in 1958. His #24 jersey was later retired by the university.

Cox played one season (1962–63) in the NBA as a member of the Chicago Zephyrs. He averaged 7.8 points per game in 73 games. He also played in the American Basketball League.

References

1936 births
Living people
All-American college men's basketball players
Amateur Athletic Union men's basketball players
American Basketball League (1961–62) players
Basketball players from Kentucky
Chicago Zephyrs players
Cleveland Pipers players
Hazard High School alumni
Kentucky Wildcats men's basketball players
New York Knicks draft picks
People from Hazard, Kentucky
People from Letcher County, Kentucky
American men's basketball players
Guards (basketball)